Christian Dumolin (born 1945, Kortrijk) of Sint-Denijs is a Belgian businessman, President and CEO of Koramic Investment Group, President and CEO of Koramic-Koceram and Vice-Chairman of Wienerberger Supervisory Board.

After he graduated in economics, he started his career in the insurance business. He took over the management of Koramic Building Products in 1980 and subsequently was appointed Chairman and Managing Director of the company. The Koramic group grew out of brick production and is active in construction material. Koramic is one of Europe's leading companies in the sector of tiles as well as one of the main divisions of the Austrian Wienerberger group. In addition Christian Dumolin was a regent of the National Bank of Belgium and also the Belgian businessman with the highest number of governing board mandates in: 129 mandates of which 7 paid.

References

Sources
 Koramic sells roof tiles division, Focus on Flanders, 11 January – 17 January 2003, Number 2, p. 6
 De rijkste families in West-Vlaanderen (Belgium) 
 Dumolin vormt Koramic om tot investeringsmaatschappij, De Tijd, 2 Aug. 2005

1945 births
Living people
Belgian businesspeople
People from Kortrijk
People from Zwevegem